Nagda-Khachrod Assembly constituency is one of the 230 Vidhan Sabha (State Legislative Assembly) constituencies of Madhya Pradesh state in central India.

Overview 
Nagda-Khachrod (Assembly constituency number 212) is one of the 7 Vidhan Sabha constituencies located in Ujjain district. This large constituency covers two cities Nagda and Khachrod with over 120 villages.

Members of Legislative Assembly

See also 
 Nagda
 Khachrod
 Ujjain (Lok Sabha constituency)

References 

Assembly constituencies of Madhya Pradesh
Politics of Ujjain